Angela V. Shelton (born March 4, 1970) is an American actress and comedian. Her television credits include Mr. Show with Bob and David, Grounded for Life, and The Suite Life of Zack & Cody. Shelton was a contestant on the NBC reality series I'm a Celebrity... Get Me out of Here!, but was eliminated on June 4, 2009. She is also one half of the L.A.-based comedy duo Frangela, the other half being Frances Callier, and Shelton was the voice of Calypso in the Spider-Man 2 video game.

Early life
Angela V. Shelton was born on March 4, 1970, in Detroit, Michigan and attended the Roeper School in Birmingham, Michigan and is a graduate of the University of Michigan.

Career
She began her acting career in 1993 at Second City Detroit. She was introduced to Frances Callier in Chicago, and the pair would later become known as Frangela.

In 2003, the Frangela duo (Shelton and Callier) starred as the protagonists of adult animated sitcom, Hey Monie!, which aired on BET and Oxygen and won a NAMIC award. Shelton voiced the eponymous Monie.

The duo perform stand-up comedy together have appeared in an ad for the Equality Campaign's "NO on Prop 8" campaign. Shelton and Callier worked on the British comedy series 3 Non-Blondes. Shelton appears regularly as Frangela on VH1s Best Week Ever. The duo recently finished their hit show An Evening with the Afro-Saxons. The duo also host a radio talk show together on KEIB on Saturday afternoons.

On September 10, 2018, Frangela began hosting a new talk show called Me Time with Frangela that is seen on television stations owned by Raycom Media.

Shelton was an original cast member of the Second City Detroit comedy troupe, which opened on September 15, 1993. Other notable cast members included Larry Joe Campbell and Keegan-Michael Key.

References

External links
 
 Frangela official website

Living people
African-American actresses
American television actresses
African-American female comedians
American women comedians
21st-century American actresses
American voice actresses
21st-century American comedians
University of Michigan alumni
21st-century African-American women
21st-century African-American people
1970 births